Cynisca senegalensis is a worm lizard species in the family Amphisbaenidae. It is found in Senegal and Guinea.

References

Cynisca (lizard)
Reptiles described in 1987
Taxa named by Carl Gans